is a Japanese professional wrestler currently working for the Japanese promotion Dragon Gate. He is a former Open the Dream Gate Champion.

Professional wrestling career

Mexican independent scene (2020)
Apart of his work for Dragon Gate, Yoshioka is known for briefly competing in the Mexican independent scene. On September 13, 2020, at a house show promoted by IWRG, he teamed up with Shun Skywalker to unsuccessfully challenge Dragon Bane and El Hijo de Canis Lupus in the finals on a number one contendership tournament for the IWRG Intercontinental Tag Team Championship.

Dragon Gate (2016-present)
Yoshioka made his professional wrestling debut on the fifteenth day of the 2016 Gate of Victory from October 29, where he teamed up with Genki Horiguchi and Ryo Saito in a losing effort against Ben-K, Masaaki Mochizuki and Peter Kaasa. He was part of the R.E.D. stable, making his debut on the fifth night of the 2020 Gate of Victory on October 7, 2020. On January 12, 2022, Yoshioka alongside Eita and Kaito Ishida were kicked out of R.E.D. due to the rest of the stable's members appointing Shun Skywalker as their new leader as a replacement for Eita. He eventually joined the D'courage stable one day later at Open the New Year Gate 2022 on January 13, where Yoshioka teamed up with Dragon Dia and defeated SB Kento and H.Y.O to win the Open the Twin Gate Championship. At Ultimo Dragon 35th Anniversary on July 30, 2022, Yoshioka defeated Kai to win the Open the Dream Gate Championship.

Yoshioka is known for competing in various of the promotion's signature events such as the Gate of Destiny. He made his first appearance at the 2018 edition of the event which took place on November 3, where he teamed up with Masaaki Mochizuki and Shun Skywalker to unsuccessfully challenge Natural Vibes (Genki Horiguchi, Kzy and Susumu Yokosuka) and  MaxiMuM (Jason Lee, Kaito Ishida and Naruki Doi) in a Three-way elimination tag team match for the Open the Triangle Gate Championship. At the 2020 edition from November 4, where he teamed up with BxB Hulk and H.Y.O in a losing effort against Team Dragon Gate (Ben-K, Dragon Dia and Strong Machine J).

Another signature event in which he competed was the King of Gate tournament. He made his first appearance at the 2019 edition, placing himself in the Block B and scoring a total of two points after going against Eita, Susumu Yokosuka, Masato Yoshino, Yasushi Kanda and Yosuke♥Santa Maria. Yoshioka won the 2022 edition of the event by defeating Kota Minoura in the finals.

Championships and accomplishments
Dragon Gate
Open the Dream Gate Championship (1 time)
Open the Twin Gate Championship (1 time) – with Dragon Dia
King of Gate (2022)

References

1994 births
Living people
Japanese male professional wrestlers
People from Gifu Prefecture
Sportspeople from Gifu Prefecture
21st-century professional wrestlers
Open the Dream Gate Champions
Open the Twin Gate Champions